Gary Mark Smith (born April 27, 1956) is an American street photographer. Smith is noted for his pioneering global range and his empathetic and literal style of photography sometimes captured in extremely hazardous circumstances.

Early life and education
Smith was born in Bethlehem, Pennsylvania. His first photographs were taken while growing up on his family farm outside Kutztown. In high school, he began photographing street life in Washington Square in nearby New York City. In 1984, he earned a Bachelor of Science in journalism from the University of Kansas in Lawrence. In 1996 he earned a Master of Arts degree, the product of a full teaching fellowship provided by Purdue University in West Lafayette, Indiana.

Career
Smith launched his career in Autumn 1978 and made street photography, blurring the line between journalism (documentary) and art. His projects included:

Cold War

In 1990 he photographed the crumbling Iron Curtain including West Germany, East Germany, Poland, Czechoslovakia, Yugoslavia, Hungary, Greece, Italy, Switzerland, France, Belgium, and the Netherlands leading up to European and German Reunification, including celebrations in Prague and on October 3, 1990 in Köln (Cologne), Germany.

In 1991 he photographed the streets of the collapse of the Soviet Union, as it dissolved.

Several expeditions to the Cold War inspired guerrilla wars in El Salvador, Guatemala, and Nicaragua, moonlighting as a journalist for the University Daily Kansan newspaper and selling combat photography he made on the side as a freelance photographer to the Associated Press, United Press International and other agencies.

"Molten Memoirs"

In September 1997, Smith gained access to the death zone of Salem, Montserrat in the Lesser Antilles in the Caribbean, becoming one of the 200 volcano holdouts there who refused to leave until a near-fatal close call eruption of the Soufriere Hills Volcano on September 22, 1997 finally forced them to flee. In February 1999 Smith released his first street photography book, a journal (Molten Memoirs: Essays, Rumors Field Notes and Photographs from the Edge of Fury) about his experience.

In July 2009, a portfolio of 45 photographs from Holdout Streets of the Montserrat Volcano Disaster was accessioned into the permanent collection of the Montserrat National Trust.

Tora Bora: An American Global Street Photographer's Post 9-11 View of the Streets of the Afghanistan/Pakistan Tribal Belt at the Time of Tora Bora.

Smith's Streets of the Post-9/11 World project including work from: Ground Zero in New York City; the Streets under the air war adjacent to the Battle of Tora Bora; the streets of the Afghanistan/Pakistan border refugee camps; the streets of the Federally Administered Tribal Areas (FATA) in Pakistan at Peshawar; beyond the Khyber Pass (Mohmand and Khyber Agencies); and to the everyday post-September 11 attacks terror war streets of Las Vegas, Paris, and Lawrence, Kansas, his hometown and the only city in North America (Bleeding Kansas) established during a terror war (John Brown; William Quantrill), resulted in his third street photography book White With Foam: Essays, Rumors, Field Notes and Photographs from the Edge of World War III (2009).

The Aftermath of Hurricane Katrina and the Flood of New Orleans

On September 1, 2005 Smith was sent by the American Red Cross to the aftermath of Hurricane Katrina and the flood of New Orleans, Louisiana, becoming a member of the Red Cross first strike team, helping run undermanned rescue shelters in southern Louisiana on the outskirts of the Flood of New Orleans. During his service he photographed the Flood of New Orleans while on a cat rescue mission afloat down Canal Street and in addition photographed the extreme hurricane surge damage of nearly the entire Mississippi Gulf Coast Highway 90.
In 2009, eight of the images were accessed into the permanent art collection at the New Orleans Museum of Art (NOMA).

Sleeping in the City: Global Street Photography from Inside the Wire.

Smith has photographed in more than 85 countries on six continents. His photographs (thematic and typically of the fashion, advertising, and particular place-defining urban elements of a location along with passing people) have been accessed into museum collections in North America, South America, and Europe.

Rocinha favela, Rio de Janeiro, Brazil

Between 2011 and 2014, Smith and partner Sarah Stern photographed the streets of the gang-controlled Favela Rocinha in Rio de Janeiro before the city's pacification of the favela. Smith went on to publish a book about the project called Favela da Rocinha, Brazil. He then continued photographing Rocinha alone as the gangs (post World Cup) retook control of most of the slum.

Goma, Congo

He embedded himself for 17 days inside the United Nations peacekeeping mission in North Kivu, the Democratic Republic of the Congo. Photographed life on the streets of Goma, capital city of the ongoing Congo Wars; also photographing life in the Mugunga refugee camp on the flanks of Mount Nyiragongo volcano.

Personal life
Smith had a difficult upbringing that ended badly, ultimately shaping resilience as a major theme in his artwork. His mother committed suicide, a victim of uncontrollable depression, when he was in the fifth grade, resulting in his development as a self-reliant and independent spirit unencumbered by self-doubt. He was knocked unconscious in secondary lightning strikes twice as a teenager, once when he was 15 and again at 19, resulting in later incorporation of the fury of nature into his global street photography method.

In 1976, Smith was abruptly disabled during a knee operation when insufficient room for swelling was left in the cast that was applied and his nerves were crushed from three inches above the knee all the way down through his left foot. This rendered him either in agonizing pain and/or existing under the influence of powerful opioid painkillers for the rest of his life.

In 1978, while hitchhiking across the United States, Smith picked up a newspaper one morning at a truck stop outside Scottsbluff, Nebraska and was inspired by an article he read promising cheaper international airfares under the new Airline Deregulation Act. That development, when blended with an inexplicable wanderlust, compelled him to become an experimental fine art global street photographer instead of the other less exciting (more painful and less pain distracting) options left available to him.

Publications

Publications by Smith
Gary Mark Smith. Molten Memoirs: Essays, Rumors, Field Notes and Photographs from the Edge of Fury. 1999, 2000, 2001, 2009. An Artist's Account of the Volcano Holdouts of Salem, Montserrat. Issued on tape for the sight impaired in 2001 by Audio Reader; 2009 issued as a Kindle Edition. 
Gary Mark Smith. Searching for Washington Square. Vol. 1, A celebration of life on the global street. Lawrence, KS: East Village PhotoArts, 2001. .
Gary Mark Smith. White with Foam: Essays, Rumors, Field Notes, and Photographs from the Edge of World War III. 2003. 3rd edition. Kindle, 2009. 
Gary Mark Smith. Goma: The Poetry of Everyday Life on the Streets of the Most Miserable Place on Earth; Inside the United Nations Peacekeeping Mission in North Kivu, the Democratic Republic of the Congo. 2016. .
Gary Mark Smith. Travelogueing The Dark Side: The ExtremeOphile Field Notes of A One-of-A-Kind Lifetime Art Project. 2018. .

Publications with others
Janet M. Cinelli. The Road to Hell: How to Make Heaven Out of Third Class Travel. Lawrence, KS: East Village TravelArts, 2009. With a foreword and photography by Gary Mark Smith. 
Sarah Stern and Gary Mark Smith, with Carlos the Filmmaker. Favela da Rocinha, Brazil. Lawrence, KS: East Village PhotoArts; Collierville, TN. 2012. .
Cover Photograph - Arundhati Roy. The God of Small Things (Italian Translation). 2003. .

Exhibitions
2006: Four of Smith's images (from Greece, Amsterdam, Montserrat and Las Vegas) were selected by photography critic Mason Resnick for inclusion in the four-month international street photography Crosswalks Exhibition at the Oklahoma City Museum of Art (OKCMOA). Later, after the exhibition closed, the museum accessioned two of Smith's digital street photographs (from Las Vegas and Amsterdam) into its permanent art collection.
2006: Two photographs from the Streets of the Aftermath of Hurricane Katrina series became part of the Katrina Exposed Exhibition (June–September) at the New Orleans Museum of Art (NOMA): Devastatingly Beautiful and Ronald McDonald Mississippi Surge-Scape.
2008: Established 30-year traveling retrospective of his global street photography from 64 countries on six continents called Sleeping in the City: Dreamscapes and Other Episodes from Inside the Wire.
2010: Photographs included in the George Eastman House International Museum of Photography and Film History of Photography celebration at Sotheby's (New York).
The Stern/Smith book about the adventure (Favela da Rocinha, Brazil), along with 20 of their photographic prints from the book were inducted into the Joan Flasch Artists Book Collection at the School of the Art Institute of Chicago. Two of Smith's photographs from the 2011 Rocinha book project were named International Masters Cup Color Award Nominees for 2012.

Awards and recognition
1991: One of four winners of American Photo magazine Photographers Career Competition.
2000: A winner of the American Photo International Reader's Competition, for his work in Montserrat.
2000: Mason Resnick at Black & White Online magazine (New York) named Smith's website streetphoto.com as one of the "Top Ten Black & White Photo Web Sites" Online.
Two photographs from his book Goma were chosen as 2016 International Masters Cup Color Award Nominees, and one of those nominees (Five Kids Atop a Basketball Hoop) was named an IMCCA  Photo of the Year winner.

Collections
2009: Eight photographs from Smith's 2007 Streets of the Aftermath of Hurricane Katrina were accepted into the permanent collection of the New Orleans Museum of Art (NOMA), as part of the hurricane memorial portfolio.
2009: A portfolio of 45 of Smith's 1997–1999 Holdout Streets of the Montserrat Volcano Disaster was accepted into the permanent collection of the Montserrat National Trust.
2011: Collection of archives, research material, negatives, prints, and personal mementos to the Kenneth Spencer Research Library at the University of Kansas, Lawrence, Kansas created in the artist's name. The library announced the formation of the Gary Mark Smith Collection as part of its Kansas Collection.

References

External links

Official website

1956 births
Living people
American photographers
American photojournalists
People from Bethlehem, Pennsylvania
People from Kutztown, Pennsylvania
People from Lawrence, Kansas
Street photographers
University of Kansas alumni
War photographers